Tadamitsu (written: 忠光, 忠晃, 忠三 or 忠需) is a masculine Japanese given name. Notable people with the name include:

, Japanese sumo wrestler
, Japanese ice hockey player
, Japanese immunologist
, Japanese daimyō

Japanese masculine given names